The Days of Being Dumb is a 1992 Hong Kong comedy film produced by Peter Chan, directed by Blackie Ko and starring Tony Leung Chiu-wai, Jacky Cheung, Eric Tsang (who also serves as the film's presenter), Kent Tong and actress Anita Yuen in her debut role.

Plot
Fred and Keith were childhood friends who dreamed of being triad members. As their became adults, they have achieved the dream and joined many gangs. However, after all the gang bosses die, the two are considered as jinxes by people and no gangs want to take them in. The two then depend on themselves to do business and get a prostitute from Singapore, Jane. Jane, however, believes she was supposed to be model and the two of them do not have courage to put her to work. Jane is also later found out to be a lesbian. Later, famous triad leader Kwan comes and takes Fred and Keith in to prove to people that he is invulnerable to their jinx. Under Kwan, these two manage to become triad heroes. However, later thing go wrong and Kwan is turned against the two and they must strike back to protect themselves.

Cast

Tony Leung as Fred Tung
Jacky Cheung as Keith
Eric Tsang as Ball
Kent Tong as Kwan
Anita Yuen as Jane
Jamie Luk as Slim
Yeung Wan-king as hoodlum tenant
Chu Tau as hoodlum tenant
Cheng Tai-kim as hoodlum tenant
Tania Wong as Lisa
Chan Chi-fai as Piggy
Wong Hung as Brother Nine
Glen Chin as General Lee
Tam Wai as Iron
Lam Chung as gangster (uncredited cameo)
Billy Ching as Gold Teeth Shing
Chun Kwai-po as Teeth's gangster
Cheung Ying-wa as car jockey
Wan Kung-wai as car jockey
Chan Leung-shun as car jockey
Ben Luk as Mr. Lau
Leung Kei-hei as Keith's dad
Wan Seung-yin as Keith's 2nd aunt
Lee Chi-hang as young Keith
William Chu as young Fred
Simon Cheung as policeman in theatre
Yeung Kei-sing as policeman in theatre
Garry Chan as Big Mouth Cheong
Sam Dang as Kwan's thug
Ng Piu-chuen as Kwan's thug
Mike Lau as Kwan's thug
Chang Yuk-chuen as Kwan's thug
Au Chiu-hang as Kwan's thug
Ng Yuk-sau as Kwan's thug
Wong Ying-kit as Little Kit
Fung Yuen-chi as Lau Pei
Tsui Kai-wah as long hair passerby
Szeto Bobby as rascal
So Chung as rascal
Cheung Sam-po as rascal
Or Wai-man as female TV reporter
Sam Kin-sang as policeman
To Kwan-pang as hawker
Tse Chi-wah as watermelon hawker
Wong Yun-ching as fat boy student
Four Tse as funeral attendee
Leung Kai-chi as Pei's gangster
Ho Chi-moon as Kwan's gangster in theatre
Kent Chow

Box office
This film grossed HK$9,883,635 during its theatrical run from 6 August to 26 August 1992 in Hong Kong.

Award

External links
Review at LoveHKFilm.com

The Days Of Being Dumb at Hong Kong Cinemagic

1992 films
1990s crime comedy films
Hong Kong crime comedy films
Triad films
1990s parody films
Hong Kong LGBT-related films
1990s Cantonese-language films
Films set in Hong Kong
Films shot in Hong Kong
Films with screenplays by James Yuen
1992 LGBT-related films
1992 comedy films
Films directed by Blackie Ko
1990s Hong Kong films